The state of New York uses the Eastern Time Zone (UTC-05:00) with daylight saving time (UTC-04:00).

See also
 Effects of time zones on North American broadcasting

References

New York
Geography of New York (state)